The 2014 ARCA Racing Series presented by Menards was the 62nd season of the ARCA Racing Series. The season began on February 15 with the Lucas Oil 200 presented by MAVTV American Real and ended on October 3 with the ARCA 98.9, after a total of 20 races.

Mason Mitchell won his first series title, through consistent finishing. Despite winning only one race all season – July's Ansell ActivArmr 150 – Mitchell finished all but two races inside the top ten placings.

Teams and drivers

Complete schedule

Limited schedule

Notes

Schedule
The 2014 series schedule was announced in December 2013.

Results and standings

Races

Drivers' championship
(key) Bold - Pole position awarded by time. Italics - Pole position set by final practice results or rainout. * – Most laps led.

Notes
1 – #23 Spencer Gallagher was not able to qualify at Daytona. Later he moved to Scott Sheldon's car (#20) and drove it in the race.
2 – #97 Tim Viens was not able to qualify at Toledo. Later he moved to Wayne Peterson's car (#06) and drove it in the race.

See also
 2014 NASCAR Sprint Cup Series
 2014 NASCAR Nationwide Series
 2014 NASCAR Camping World Truck Series
 2014 NASCAR K&N Pro Series East
 2014 NASCAR K&N Pro Series West
 2014 NASCAR Whelen Modified Tour
 2014 NASCAR Whelen Southern Modified Tour
 2014 NASCAR Canadian Tire Series
 2014 NASCAR Toyota Series
 2014 NASCAR Whelen Euro Series

References

External links

ARCA
ARCA Menards Series seasons